Karen Dunne (born December 30, 1967 in Detroit, Michigan) is a retired female professional cyclist from the United States. She is best known for winning the gold medal at the women's individual road race at the 1999 Pan American Games in Winnipeg, Manitoba, Canada. She also won 11 U.S. National Championships: 3 Elite (Points race, Criterium, Kilometer Time Trial), 3 Collegiate (Criterium, 500 Meter Time Trial, Track Omnium), and 5 Mixed Tandem (Pursuit, 2 x Kilometer Time Trial, 2 x Match Sprints). Her cycling career began while attending Indiana University  in Bloomington where she won the 1991 Women's Little 500.

Career highlights

2000
 GP Feminin International du Quebec: First, second, and third place stage finishes
 GP Feminin International du Quebec: Most aggressive rider award
 USA Cycling's (USAC) Olympic Long Team, Road
 Selected to receive one of 100 Olympic Edition Commemorative vehicles through the UAW-GM The Team Behind The Team program in conjunction with the Sydney Olympic Games.
 Wendy’s International Stage Race: Overall winner and two stage wins
 Sea Otter Classic: Stage winner, road race
 Redlands Bicycle Classic: Sprint jersey winner

1999
 Pan American Games Road Race: Gold medal
 U.S. National Criterium Championships: Gold medal
 Visa/USA Cycling's Elite Road Female Athlete of the Year
 HP International Women's Challenge: Sprint jersey winner
 UCI Women’s Road World Cup, First Union Liberty Classic: Silver medal
 United States Association of Blind Athletes National Championships with Matt King: Gold medal - Mixed Tandem Match Sprints

1998
 UCI Track World Cups: 3rd and 4th, Points race
 United States Association of Blind Athletes National Championships: Gold medals - Mixed Tandem Match Sprints and Kilometer Time Trial

1997
 U.S. National Track Championships: Gold medal, Points race
 UCI Track World Cup: 5th, Points race
 United States Association of Blind Athletes National Championships: Gold medals - Mixed Tandem Pursuit and Kilometer Time Trial

1996
 Tour Cycliste Féminin: Two fourth place stage finishes (Stage 2 La Roche sur Yon to La Tremblade and Stage 5 Saint-Orens de Gameville to Carcassonne)

1995
 PowerBar International Women's Challenge: 2nd place - sprint classification
 U.S. Olympic Festival: Two Gold medals, two Silver medals

1994
 Goodwill Games: Bronze medal
 U.S. National Criterium Championships: Silver medal
 U.S. National Track Championships: Gold medal - Kilometer Time Trial; Bronze medal - Points race
 PowerBar International Women's Challenge: 1st, 2nd and 3rd place stage finishes
 U.S. Collegiate National Championships: Gold Medals - Criterium, 500 Meter Time Trial, and Track Omnium; Silver Medal - Match Sprints

References

External links
 Personal website

1967 births
Living people
American female cyclists
Cyclists at the 1999 Pan American Games
Sportspeople from Colorado Springs, Colorado
Pan American Games medalists in cycling
Pan American Games gold medalists for the United States
Competitors at the 1994 Goodwill Games
Goodwill Games medalists in cycling
Medalists at the 1999 Pan American Games
21st-century American women